Charles-Henri de Blainville (1711–1769 [or after 1771]) was a French composer, cellist, pedagogue and music theorist.

Biography
The birthplace of Charles-Henri de Blainville remains uncertain, François-Joseph Fétis wrote that he came from Tours, which all the other biographers have copied. In the preface of his Sonatas Op. 1 of 1740 is mentioned "By Mr. Blainville de Roüen". Blainville entered the service of the Marquise de Villeroy. He wrote vocal and instrumental works which had little success. In 1751, he made himself known by affirming that there existed a "third mode", between minor and major. He wrote two theoretical works: L'Esprit de l'art musical ou réflexions sur la musique and L'Histoire générale, critique et philosophie de la musique.

He died in Paris.

Works (selection)
Operas
Thésée, opera (lost)
Miadas, one-act heroic comedy (Paris, 1753) (lost)

Orchestral music
Symphonie à double quatuor, presented at the Concert Spirituel in 1741, lost
Six simphonies, Op. 1, c. 1750
Six simphonies, Op. 2, c. 1750

Chamber music
Six sonates en trio, for two violins or two flutes and bass, Op. 1 (c. 1740)
Premier livre de sonates pour le dessus de viole (c. 1750)

Second livre de sonates à deux violoncelles (c. 1750)

Sacred music
Les Secondes leçons ténèbres (Paris, 1759)

Secular vocal music
La Prise de Berg op Zoom (Paris, 1751)
Le Dépit amoureux (Paris, c. 1755)
Ode, text by Jean-Jacques Rousseau, for male voice and double bass, presented at the Concert Spirituel in 1757
Récueil des récréations lyriques, for two voices, with accompaniment of violin and cello (Paris, 1771), lost

Writings
1751: Charles Henri de Blainville, Essai sur un troisième mode
1754: Charles Henri de Blainville, L'Esprit de l'art musical ou réflexions sur la musique (Geneva: Minkoff, 1975); 
1767: Charles Henri de Blainville, Histoire générale, critique et philosophie de la musique, Le Grand livre du mois (1972)

Bibliography
 "Blainville" in the Dictionnaire de la musique en France aux XVIIe and XVIIIe siècles (Paris: Fayard, 1992);

External links
 
 Blainville, Charles Henri de (1711–1769), theorist, composer, cellist on Oxford index
 Charles Henri de Blainville
 François-Joseph Fétis: Biographie universelle des musiciens et bibliographie générale de la musique (1860)
 
 

1711 births
18th-century deaths
18th-century classical composers
French Baroque composers
French classical cellists
French male classical composers
French music theorists
18th-century French composers
18th-century French male musicians
17th-century male musicians